"2 Times" is the debut single of British singer Ann Lee. It was released in 1999 as the lead single from her debut album, Dreams (1999). The single entered and peaked at number two on the UK Singles Chart. Outside the United Kingdom, the single topped the charts of Flanders and peaked within the top 10 in several countries, including Australia, Germany, Ireland, Italy, and New Zealand.

Background and composition
Ann Lee's previous work on a large number of Eurodance projects would help her receive a contract with Alfredo Larry Pignagnoli, with whom she had already worked with on the Whigfield project as a songwriter, amongst others. He worked on a track with Marco Sorcini called "Two Times". The song is played in a F major key in common time at a BPM of 132, and throughout follows chord progression F-C7.

Critical reception
A reviewer from Daily Record wrote, "This sounds like a line-dancing song reworked for the techno market, but it's worked for Ann Lee who has already topped the charts across Europe." The Guardian described it as "giddy".

Commercial performance
The song achieved success in many European countries where it was a top-10 hit, particularly in Scotland and the Flanders region of Belgium, where it reached number one. It peaked at number two in Denmark, Ireland, New Zealand and the United Kingdom; it has sold over 500,000 copies in the UK as of 2014. It was also a top-10 hit in Australia after initially receiving frequent airplay on Melbourne radio station KIX FM.

Music video
The song's accompanying music video was released in 1999 by Energy Productions. It sees Ann Lee performing the song during a day in her life, beginning with her waking up in the morning in her hut. She cooks, plays with her doll, takes a stroll on the beach and has a bath in her bathtub. The video ends with Lee sleeping in her bed. The singer has noted that the structure and cinematography of the video was very similar to that of Peter Gabriel's "Sledgehammer"; "The two videos were similar! I remember perfectly the 'sledge video' (love Peter Gabriel!) and my movements are in fact very similar - but I think the similarity ends there". Parts of the music video were filmed in Whitstable, Kent.

Track listings

 Italian and Australian CD single
 "2 Times" (original edit mix) – 3:46
 "2 Times" (original extended mix) – 6:32
 "2 Times" (G. side) – 5:32
 "2 Times" (GambaClub) – 5:14
 "2 Times" (GambaDub) – 4:15

 German and Dutch CD single
 "2 Times" (original edit mix) – 3:46
 "2 Times" (original extended mix) – 6:32

 German maxi-CD single
 "2 Times" (original edit mix/radio edit) – 3:46
 "2 Times" (Gamba club) – 5:14
 "2 Times" (original extended mix) – 6:32
 "2 Times" (Gamba dub)	– 4:15
 "2 Times" (G. Side) – 5:32

 UK CD single
 "2 Times" (original radio edit)
 "2 Times" (Gamba Club)
 "2 Times" (Bulletproof Euro Mix)

 UK 12-inch single
A1. "2 Times" (original extended mix)
B1. "2 Times" (Gamba Club Mix)
B2. "2 Times" (Bulletproof Euro Mix)

 UK cassette single
 "2 Times" (original radio edit)
 "2 Times" (Gamba Club)

Charts and certifications

Weekly charts

Year-end charts

Certifications

Release history

References

1999 songs
1999 debut singles
Number-one singles in Scotland
Songs written by Ann Lee (singer)
Ultratop 50 Singles (Flanders) number-one singles
ZYX Music singles
Songs written by Dhany